Premala Sivaprakasapillai née Sivasegaram (born 22 April 1942) is a Sri Lankan engineer. She is regarded as the country’s first female engineer and the first female civil engineer. She is also one of the prominent members of the Institution of Engineers, Sri Lanka.

In March 2019, she was acknowledged as one of twelve female change-makers in Sri Lanka by the parliament, coinciding with International Women's Day.

Biography 
Her father Thambyapillai Sivaprakasapillai was an engineer who worked at the Colombo Port. Her family stayed in Colombo but was later forced to move back to their hometown, Jaffna, following the bombing on Colombo Port by the Japanese in 1942 on the eve of Easter Sunday. Sivasegaram was born on 22 April 1942 in Jaffna.

Career 
Sivasegaram received her education at the Ladies' College. She then entered the engineering faculty at the University of Ceylon in 1960. In 1964 she became the country’s first female engineering undergraduate and the first female engineer. After graduating she was appointed as an instructor in the engineering faculty at the university.

Sivasegaram received a scholarship to Somerville College, Oxford enabling her to gain a doctorate degree in structural engineering and on behalf of the college she attended the International Conference for Women Engineers and Scientists in 1967. Whilst studying there, she joined the British Women's Engineering Society in 1966 and took part in their launch of the first Women in Engineering Year in 1969.

In 1978, she became the first female chief structural engineer in the country and was transferred to the Designs Office in Colombo. She served as one of the prominent engineers in the country when open economic policies were introduced in 1977 by the then President Junius Richard Jayawardene.

Sivasegaram moved to England following the 1983 Black July riots and returned to Sri Lanka once the normalcy was established.

Recognition 
In 2015 she was a recipient of the 'Excellence in Engineering Award', awarded by the Institution of Engineers, Sri Lanka.

In March 2019, she was acknowledged as one of twelve female change-makers in Sri Lanka by the parliament, coinciding with International Women's Day.

References 

1942 births
Living people
Sri Lankan engineers
Sri Lankan Tamil civil engineers
Alumni of Ladies' College, Colombo
Alumni of Somerville College, Oxford
Women engineers
Women's Engineering Society
Sri Lankan Tamil women